Jed W. DeVries (born January 6, 1971) is a former American football tackle. He played for the Seattle Seahawks, Cleveland Browns, Baltimore Ravens and Philadelphia Eagles from 1994 to 1997. He played college football at Utah State University. He played two games during 1995 season.

References 

1971 births
Living people
American football offensive tackles
Utah State Aggies football players
Seattle Seahawks players
Cleveland Browns players
Baltimore Ravens players
People from Ogden, Utah
Players of American football from Utah